Gim Myeong-guk (김명국, b. 1600, d. after 1662), also known as Kim Myeong-guk, was a full-time painter of the mid Joseon period of Korea.

Life and legacy
Gim Myeong-guk was born in 1600. He entered the royal service as a member of the Dohwaseo, the official painters of the Joseon court.

Quite immediately, Gim Myeong-guk appeared as a new type of artist, clearly distinctive from his contemporaries, who more or less worked as craftsmen that faithfully replicated mainstream styles. A diplomatic statement is "he was known to have an artistic personality that was characterized by individualism and obstinacy", while an understatement would be "his contemporaries described him as a carefree drunkard, a characterization that corresponds to the Chinese image of the eccentric artist".

Nevertheless, (or precisely for this reason), Gim Myeong-guk has been in charge of many official artistic tasks. 
He was member of both the large-scale Tongsinsa send to Japan by King Injo (1595–1623–1649). The 1636 delegation was led by Im Gwang (1579–1644), while the 1643 delegation was led by Yun Sunji (1591–1666). "According to one account, Gim became distraught with exhaustion because an endless stream of Japanese enthusiasts, eager to purchase his works, would not allow him a moment of peace". Dalmado (cf infra) was painted during his second trip to Japan.

In 1647, he directed a team of 6 Senior painters (화원) and 66 other people to repair the Changgyeong Palace. Later he was in charge of portraits of meritorious subjects. The circumstances and the year of his death are unknown. His last known painting (Sasipalgyeongdo) dates back to 1662.

Gallery

Although retained as a court painter, Gim was also a pioneering artist who insisted on creating works that were true to his personality and sentiments.

Most of the Gim Myeong-guk paintings involving people have Buddhist themes (and a specific artistic style). His pen name Yeondam ("Lotus pond") has Buddhist connotations. Yi Saek was the scholar official that opposed the  overthrowing of Buddhism at the foundation of the Joseon Kingdom.

 

 

His landscape paintings are more 'mainstream', but nevertheless specific.

The Korean Copyright Commission lists 24 paintings for Gim Myeong-guk, while Towooart gives a short notice.

See also
Korean painting
List of Korean painters
Korean art

References

Bibliography

External links
Arts of Korea, an exhibition catalog from The Metropolitan Museum of Art Libraries (fully available online as PDF), which contains material on Gim Myeong-guk

17th-century Korean painters
Gim clan of Ansan
1600 births
Year of death unknown
Buddhist artists